"The Prince" is a song by British ska/pop band Madness. It was written by Lee Thompson, and was the band's first single. On 10 August 1979 the single was released through 2 Tone Records and peaked at number 16 in the UK Singles Chart, spending a total of 11 weeks in the charts.

"The Prince" is a tribute to Jamaican ska singer Prince Buster, who influenced Madness (the band took their name from one of his songs, "Madness", which they covered on the b-side of "The Prince").

Music video
As this was the band's first single, they were relatively unknown prior to the release. Due to this fact, no music video was filmed for the single. However, the band later bought the rights to a performance on Top of the Pops from 6 September 1979. This performance has since become associated with the single, and has featured on compilations featuring the band's music videos.

Different recordings
The song was initially recorded on 16 June 1979 at the Pathway Studios, Highbury. The track was then remixed on 9 July of the same year, along with the single's B-side, "Madness". The remix was in order to remove the hum from Thompson's saxophone solo. However, Mike Barson showed displeasure at the mix of "Madness".

The song was re-recorded later that year for the One Step Beyond... album. As well as having a distinctively clearer sound, the song had a slight change in lyrics and Mike Barson later admitted in the 33 1/3 book One Step Beyond... that he preferred it to the single version. The B-side, "Madness", was also re-recorded for the album in a more multi-layered arrangement.

Track listing

7" vinyl single
Side one
"The Prince" (Lee Thompson) – 2:30
Side two
"Madness" (Cecil Campbell) – 2:32

Charts

References

External links

Songs about musicians
Cultural depictions of reggae musicians
1979 debut singles
Madness (band) songs
Songs written by Lee Thompson (saxophonist)
2 Tone Records singles
1979 songs
Song recordings produced by Clive Langer